Twin Buttes Reservoir is an artificial lake located about  southwest of the city of San Angelo, Texas, and immediately upstream from Lake Nasworthy. Construction on Twin Buttes Dam to form the reservoir was completed in 1963.  The dam is an unusual one – it dams the Middle and South Concho Rivers separately; a stabilization channel runs between the two sides of the lake. Water levels fell significantly during the 2010–13 Southern United States drought and remained low into 2014.

Functions
Twin Buttes Reservoir was established to provide flood control, irrigation, water conservation, and a primary drinking water source for San Angelo and the surrounding communities in Tom Green County.  The lake also serves as a recreational venue for fishing, boating, and swimming. The dam and reservoir are owned by the United States Bureau of Reclamation, and are managed by the City of San Angelo.

Design 
The Twin Buttes Reservoir has two dams, one on the Middle Concho River and the South Concho River. The length of these two  rolled earthfill embankments is approximately 42,000 ft with an elevation of just under 2,000 ft above sea level; however, the water level is an average of 1,985 ft above sea level.

Fish populations
Twin Buttes Reservoir has been stocked with species of fish intended to improve the utility of the reservoir for recreational fishing. Fish present in the lake include largemouth bass, white bass, catfish, and crappie.

Vegetation 
Three invasive species of vegetation have taken over the land around the reservoir. Along the shoreline is dense saltceder and it grows thick with approximately 3,000 stems per acre. Willow baccharis and Mesquite both grow densely throughout the offshore areas.

References

External links
 Twin Buttes Reservoir (blog)

1963 establishments in Texas
Protected areas of Tom Green County, Texas
Reservoirs in Texas
Dams in Texas
United States Bureau of Reclamation dams
Dams completed in 1963
Bodies of water of Tom Green County, Texas